This is a list of football clubs located in Qatar, sorted alphabetically.

 Al-Ahly Doha
 Al-Arabi SC (Qatar)
 Al Bidda SC
 Al-Gharafa Sports Club
 Al Kharaitiyat SC
 Al-Khor Sports Club
 Al-Duhail SC
 Al-Markhiya Sports Club
 Al-Mesaimeer Sports Club
 Al-Mu'aidar Sports Club
 Qatar SC
 Al Rayyan Sports Club
 Sadd Sports Club
 Al-Sailiya Sport Club
 Al-Shahaniya Sports Club
 Al-Shamal Sports Club
 Umm Salal Sport Club
 Al-Wakrah Sports Club

Qatar
 
clubs
Football